Michael Tremain Sinterniklaas (born August 13, 1972) is a French voice actor, ADR director and script writer who has provided voices for a number of English language versions of Japanese anime films and television series, as well as cartoons and video games. He has worked for Funimation, Studiopolis, Konami Cross Media NY, Central Park Media, Bandai Entertainment, Viz Media and Media Blasters. He is the founder and owner of NYAV Post, a Bi-coastal studio located in New York City and Los Angeles, which dubbed many different anime titles and recorded several original prelay works.

He is best known for his roles as Leonardo in the 2003 series of Teenage Mutant Ninja Turtles, Dean Venture in The Venture Bros. and Taki Tachibana in the English dub of Your Name.

Early life
Michael Tremain Sinterniklaas was born on August 13, 1972, in Nice, France, to Dutch parents. He lived in London and Lucerne as a child and moved to the United States when he was 10 years old. He graduated from High School of Performing Arts in New York City, and attended college in North Carolina where he did work at both Southwynde and Coastal Carolina Studios.

Career

His most notable roles as a voice actor are Leonardo in 2003 series of Teenage Mutant Ninja Turtles, Dean Venture (and other small parts) in the Adult Swim cartoon The Venture Bros, Mikey Simon in the Nicktoons series Kappa Mikey, Orphan in Final Fantasy XIII and as Deady in the 2011 Friday the 13th event of the online MMORPG AdventureQuest Worlds. He also replaced David Moo as Xellos in the English dub of Slayers Revolution and Evolution-R.

He is also a well known voice director, for a variety of shows, such as Berserk, Huntik: Secrets & Seekers, Kappa Mikey, Kurokami: The Animation, Magic User's Club, Mobile Suit Gundam Unicorn, Samurai Deeper Kyo, Slayers Revolution, Slayers Evolution-R, Let's Go! Tamagotchi, Three Delivery, Care Bears and The Venture Bros.

Dubbing roles

Anime

 A Silent Voice - Kazuki Shimada
 Alien Nine – Hiroshi Iwanami
 B-Daman CrossFire – Yuki Washimura (credited as Martel Fraiser Tremain)
 Bakuman – Moritaka Mashiro
 Black Butler: Book of Circus – Dagger
 Bleach – Nnoitora Gilga, Luppi Antenor, Menis, Ikkaku Madarame (Ep. 105), Wonderweiss Mergera (Eps. 278+)
 Burst Angel – Jei Kokuren (Ep. 9)
 Bubblegum Crisis – Mackie Stingray (Young), AD Police Officer
 Cannon Busters  - Additional voices
 Case Closed – Keenan Morris (Ep. 6)
 Cyborg 009 VS Devilman – Cyborg 004/Albert Heinrich
 D.Gray-Man – Dodge (Ep. 18)
 Di Gi Charat – Ky Schweitzer
 Digimon Fusion – Lucemon (Ep. 15–17)
 Dinosaur King  – David Neckam, additional voices
 Domain of Murder – Goro Nagase
 Durarara!! – Additional voices
 Eden of the East – Satoshi Osugi
 Eden of the East: The King of Eden – Satoshi Osugi
 Eden of the East: Paradise Lost – Satoshi Osugi
 Fairy Tail: Dragon Cry – King Animus
 Freedom Project – Takeru
 Fullmetal Alchemist – Leo
 Future Diary – Assemblyman (ep. 19), additional voices
 Gall Force: New Era – Nova Universe
 GaoGaiGar: The King of Braves – Gai Shishiô
 Glass Fleet – Subordinate (Eps. 24 & 26)
 Gokusen – Ichikawa, Ishizuka, Sonomura, Tanaka
 Hades Project Zeorymer – Saiga
 Hetalia: Axis Powers – Netherlands
 Hetalia: The Beautiful World – Netherlands
 Hetalia: The World Twinkle – Netherlands (Ep. 17)
 Hetalia: World Series – Netherlands
 Hi no Tori – Masato (The Future Chapter)
 Ichi the Killer – Ichi
 Joe vs. Joe – Joe Yuuki
 Jormungand – Gasud (Ep. 5)
 Jormungand: Perfect Order – Gasud (Ep. 4)
 Kakurenbo – Hikora
 Kizuna: Bonds of Love – Kai Sagano
 Kekkaishi – Shu Akitsu, Yukimasa
 Knight Hunters: Weiß Kreuz – Brad Crawford
 Kotaro Lives Alone - Shin Karino
 Kurokami: The Animation – Punipuni, Pilot, The Noble One (Ep. 14), Tribal End
 Let's Go Tamagotchi – Gozanutchi
 Lu over the Wall - Kai
 Lupin the 3rd Part IV: The Italian Adventure - Koh Uraga, Mario (Ep. 15)
 Magic User's Club – Yoshito Yoshimoto
 Magical DoReMi – Stewart, Mackenzie
 Marvel Anime: Blade – Tanaka (Eps. 1 & 2), Vampire Guard (Ep. 1)
 Marvel Anime: Iron Man – Lab Employee (Ep. 6), Operator (Ep. 8), Pisces/Sho (Ep. 6)
 Marvel Anime: X-Men – Hisako's Father, Ray, Mr. Ichiki, Rat
 Marvel Future Avengers – Maximus, Triton
 Mobile Suit Gundam Unicorn – Angelo Sauper, Dennis (Ep. 1), Besson, additional voices
 Monster – Detective Jan Suk
 Mr. Osomatsu – Jyushimatsu Matsuno 
 Munto – Kazuya
 Mushishi – Isaza (Ep. 26)
 Naruto Shippuden – Sora, Utakata (Six Tails Jinchūriki), Reincarnated Ninja (Ep. 316), Villager (Ep. 150)
 Ninja Nonsense – Takeru
 One Piece – Disco, Additional Voices (FUNimation dub)
 Patema Inverted – Age
 Patlabor: The Mobile Police - The TV Series – Utsumi
 Piano: The Melody of a Young Girl's Heart – Kazuya Takahashi
 Pokémon - Joshua, Seviper, Additional Voices (seasons 5-8)
 Samurai 7 – Sobei
 Samurai Deeper Kyo – Akira, The Two Headed Dragon
 Sengoku Basara: End of Judgement – Sarutobi Sasuke
 Sengoku Basara: Samurai Kings – Sarutobi Sasuke
 Sengoku Basara: Samurai Kings II – Sarutobi Sasuke
 Sengoku Basara: The Last Party – Sarutobi Sasuke
 Shaman King – Trey "Horohoro" Racer, Orona
 Shin-chan (FUNimation dub) – Phillippe, The Flying Pecker
 Shootfighter Tekken – Kiichi "Keybo" Miyazawa
 Slayers – Xellos (Seasons 4 & 5)
 Sonic X - Christopher Thorndyke (adult) (Season 2 & 3)
 Space Dandy – Defense lawyer (Ep. 25)
 Stitch! – Hans (Season 2)
 Summer Wars – Kenji Koiso
 Tiger & Bunny – Ivan Karelin/Origami Cyclone
 Time of Eve – Masakazu Masaki
 The Galaxy Railways – Filidh (Ep. 17), Owen
 The Sky Crawlers – Yuichi Kannami
 The Weathering Continent – Arun Harad
 Urusei Yatsura – Ataru Moroboshi
 Weathering with You - Taki Tachibana (cameo)
 Welcome to the Space Show – Kyoshi Sato
 Winx Club (4Kids dub) – Riven
 Your Lie in April – Akira Takayanagi
 Your Name – Taki Tachibana
 Zetman – Man (Ep. 1)

TV Series
 Violetta - Leon Vargas (Seasons 2 and 3)

Filmography

Animation

 Care Bears: Welcome to Care-a-Lot – Bedtime Bear, Birthday Bear, Funshine Bear
 Chaotic – Additional voices
 Ernest & Celestine – Additional voices
 Friends of Heartlake City
 G.I. Joe: Sigma Six – Tunnel Rat, Kamakura
 Hanazuki – Orange Hemka, Pink Hemka, Dark Purple Hemka, Lavender Hemka, Light Blue Hemka, Dark Green Hemka, various voices
 Huntik: Secrets & Seekers – Peter
 Impy's Island – Professor Horatio Tibberton
 Kappa Mikey – Mikey Simon
 Lego Monkie Kid – Goldfish Demon
 Mad – Leonardo, Steven Spielberg, Aquaman, Ethan Hunt
 Miraculous Ladybug – Nathaniel Kurtzberg/Caprikid
 OK K.O.! Let's Be Heroes – Hero, Frank Bank
 Robotomy – Weenus, Megawatt
 Speed Racer: The Next Generation – Jared, Jesse
 Star Wars: Visions – Hen Jin
 Supernormal – Eric Normal/Captain Scrumptious 
 Teenage Mutant Ninja Turtles – Leonardo, Dark Leo, Parker, Lord Hebi, Graviturtle, Weasel
 The Batman – Man screaming 'It's Joker'
 The Venture Bros. – Dean Venture, various voices
 Turtles Forever – 2003 Leonardo
 Pickle & Peanut - Additional Voices

Video games

 Adventure Quest Worlds – Deady 
 Bravely Second: End Layer – Yew
 Dragon Ball Xenoverse 2 – Time Patroller Final Fantasy XIII – Orphan 
 Final Fantasy XIII-2 – Additional voices
 Fire Emblem Heroes – Takumi, Niles, Lucius
 Grand Theft Auto V – The Local Population
 Rainbow Six Siege - Jäger <Wiki fandom>
 Naruto Shippuden: Ultimate Ninja Storm 3 – Utakata
 Naruto Shippuden: Ultimate Ninja Storm 4 – Utakata
 Naruto Shippuden: Ultimate Ninja Storm Revolution – Utakata
 ObsCure – Kenny Matthews (uncredited)
 Pillars of Eternity – Additional voices
 Rune Factory 4 Special – Vishnal
 Saint's Row: The Third – Radio voices
 Shira Oka: Second Chances – Kazuki Ogawa
 Sengoku Basara: Samurai Heroes – Sarutobi Sasuke
 Shaman King: Power of Spirit – Trey Racer (Horohoro), Clive Portman
 Shaman King: Master of Spirits – Trey Racer (Horohoro)
 Shaman King: Master of Spirits 2 – Trey Racer (Horohoro)
 The Bureau: XCOM Declassified – Lawrence
 The Last of Us – Additional voices
 The Lego Movie Videogame – Additional voices
 The Pink Panther: Passport to Peril – Pink Panther, Louie, Kumoken, Young Li, Nigel, Additional voices
 The Pink Panther: Hokus Pokus Pink – Pink Panther 
 The Vanishing of Ethan Carter – Dale Carter
 Tom Clancy's Rainbow Six: Siege – Jäger
 Teenage Mutant Ninja Turtles series – Leonardo, Leatherhead, Utrominator
 Xenoblade Chronicles X – Gwin Ewans

Live-action

 Answer This! – Umlatt the Flunkie
 Cutie Honey – Detective Todoroki (English voice-over)
 Flesh for the Beast – Martin Shelley
 Matlock – Pizza Guy
 Once a Loser – Cam Dean
 The Crow – Extra (uncredited)
 Violetta – Braco (English dub) / Leon (Seasons 2-3) (English dub)
 Zero Woman: The Accused – Mitsuru (English dub)
 Rurouni Kenshin: Kyoto Inferno — Cho Sawagejo (English dub)

Documentary
 Adventures in Voice Acting – Himself

Production staff
Voice direction

 009 Re:Cyborg (co-directed with Anthony Tortorici)
 A Cat in Paris (co-directed with Stephanie Sheh)
 A.D. Police Files Ah! My Goddess Ancien and the Magic Tablet (co-directed with Stephanie Sheh)
 Berserk Cannon Busters (co-directed with Stephanie Sheh)
 DC Super Friends Freedom (co-directed with Carrie Keranen and Stephanie Sheh)
 King of Braves GaoGaiGar Giant Robo: The Animation Huntik: Secrets & Seekers – Voice director (with Marc Diraison (season 1) and Stephanie Sheh)
 Jungle Emperor Leo Kurokami: The Animation (co-directed with Marc Diraison)
 Magic User's Club Mao Mao: Heroes of Pure Heart Mia and the Migoo Mobile Suit Gundam Unicorn (co-directed with Marc Diraison, Dan Green, Stephanie Sheh and Kathleen McInerney)
 Ninja Nonsense Peter Rabbit Piano: The Melody of a Young Girl's Heart Phoenix Promare (co-directed with Michael Schneider and Stephanie Sheh)
 Robotomy (also worked as a casting director)
 Samurai Deeper Kyo Slayers Revolution (co-directed with Marc Diraison)
 Slayers Evolution-R (co-directed with Marc Diraison)
 Twin Signal Let's Go! Tamagotchi! (co-directed with Marc Diraison)
 The Midnight Gospel The Weathering Continent Three Delivery (co-directed with Marc Diraison)
 The Venture Bros. Weathering with You (co-directed with Stephanie Sheh)

Script adaptation

 Berserk Bubblegum Crisis Cutie Honey Freedom (co-written with Stephanie Sheh, Jay Snyder and Marc Handler)
 Giant Robo: The Animation (co-written with Stephanie Sheh and Jay Snyder)
 Phoenix (co-written with Stephanie Sheh and Jay Snyder)
 Magic User's Club Mobile Suit Gundam Unicorn (co-written with Stephanie Sheh and Dan Green)
 Twin SignalSound department

 A.D. Police Files (audio engineer, dialogue editing)
 Ah! My Goddess (audio mixing)
 Battle Royal High School (audio engineer, dialogue editing, mixing, sound design)
 Berserk (mixing)
 Berserk: The Golden Age Arc (recording engineer, re-recording mixing, post-production supervisor)
 Bubblegum Crash (dialogue editing)
 Bubblegum Crisis (dialogue editing)
 Demon Fighter Kocho (audio mixing)
 Cutie Honey (mixing)
 Domain of Murder (recording engineer)
 Freedom Project (ADR recording engineer)
 Giant Robo: The Animation (mixing)
 Jungle Emperor Leo (mixing)
 Kurokami the Animation (mixing)
 Magic User's Club (mixing)
 Mia and the Migoo (recording engineer, sound design, mixing)
 Negadon: The Monster from Mars (mixing)
 Sadamitsu the Destroyer (audio engineer, mixing)
 Samurai Deeper Kyo (audio engineer, mixing)
 Seven of Seven (mixing)
 Shura no Toki: Age of Chaos (mix engineer)
 Supernormal (sound engineer, mix engineer)
 Twin Signal (mixing)
 The Weathering Continent (mixing)
 Weiß Kreuz (mixing)
 Welcome to the Space Show (mixing)
 Zetman (re-recording mixing)

Producer/production manager
 Ah! My Goddess Bakuman Berserk Cutie Honey Gokusen Mia and the Migoo Phoenix Slayers Revolution/Slayers Evolution-R Space Pirate Mito Time of EveCasting
 Mao Mao, Heroes of Pure Heart''

References

External links
 
 
 
 Michael Sinterniklaas at Twitter

1972 births
Living people
American casting directors
American male screenwriters
American male voice actors
American people of Dutch descent
American male television writers
American sound designers
American television writers
American voice directors
Film producers from California
Film producers from New York (state)
French audio engineers
French emigrants to the United States
French film producers
French male screenwriters
French male voice actors
French people of Dutch descent
French television producers
French television writers
French voice directors
Male actors from London
Male actors from Los Angeles
Male actors from New York City
Male actors from Nice, France
Male actors from North Carolina
Screenwriters from California
Screenwriters from New York (state)
Television producers from California
Television producers from New York City
21st-century American male actors
21st-century French male actors